Gidget is the debut EP by the Santa Cruz, California-based hardcore punk band Good Riddance, released in 1993 through Austin, Texas record label Little Deputy Records. The EP is titled after the fictional character Gidget, and the cover image is of actress Sally Field as the character from the Gidget television series of 1965–1966. Singer Russ Rankin later recalled "that recording was from our first demo tape. Little Deputy basically took four songs from that demo tape and pressed 'em". It was the band's only recording with bassist Devin Quinn, who according to Rankin was "a disciple of Pete [Rypins] from Crimpshrine and Matt [Freeman] from Operation Ivy and you can hear all his runs and counter melodies in ['Not So Bad']." "Last Believer" was titled after an episode of the 1991 PBS documentary series on President Lyndon B. Johnson; the song was re-recorded for the band's 1996 album A Comprehensive Guide to Moderne Rebellion.

Track listing

Personnel

Band 
 Russ Rankin – vocals
 Luke Pabich – guitar
 Devin Quinn – bass guitar
 Rich McDermott – drums

Production 
 Joe Logsdon – recording and mix engineer

References

External links 
 Gidget at Little Deputy Records

Good Riddance (band) EPs
1993 EPs